The men's 100 metre backstroke event at the 1980 Summer Olympics was held on 20 and 21 July at the Swimming Pool at the Olimpiysky Sports Complex.

Records
Prior to this competition, the existing world and Olympic records were as follows.

Results

Heats

Semifinals

Final

References

B
Men's events at the 1980 Summer Olympics